Metopoceras canroberti is a moth of the family Noctuidae. It is found in Morocco, Yemen, Algeria and eastern Africa.

The wingspan is about 26 mm.

External links
species info

Metopoceras